Grigore Grigoriu (1899 – after 1975) was a Romanian football player.

Grigoriu was the first team captain of Rapid București and one of its founders. He had previously played for Venus București (1918–1923). The team's first jerseys were made in his house by hand by the wife of another Rapid founder Geza Ginzer, who chose the burgundy color instead of white because it was easier for her to wash it.

Grigoriu only played for two years for Rapid, before leaving for a wealthier team, Juventus București, in 1925. Although he felt bad to leave the team he helped be created, he was allowed to leave for a more prestigious team of the time.

Honours
Venus București
Divizia A: 1919–20, 1920–21

References

1899 births
Romanian footballers
Association football midfielders
Liga I players
Venus București players
FC Rapid București players
FC Petrolul Ploiești players
Year of death missing